Puggy is a Belgian band formed in 2004, when French bassist Romain Descampe and English vocalist Matthew Irons met Swedish drummer Egil "Ziggy" Franzén at a jazz school in Brussels. For this reason the band considers itself Belgian in origin. The band has released four albums and is signed to Mercury Records.

Career
Puggy has toured all over the world, opening for prestigious bands such as Smashing Pumpkins, Incubus, and Deep Purple. Their first album, Dubois Died Today, was released on independent label Talkieo in June 2007. In 2010, they appeared on the French television show Taratata, presented by Nagui, to promote their follow-up album, Something You Might Like. They also performed live on Belgian television. The album resulted in three music videos, for the songs "I Do", "When You Know" and "How I Needed you". "When You Know" is also the theme song for the French television series Detectives.

In 2013, the band released their third album To Win the World, certified platinum in Belgium.

They have toured extensively in France, Belgium, Switzerland and the Netherlands.
In 2014 they played a sold-out Forest National in Brussels (9000 capacity) as well as a sold-out club tour all around Belgium.

The band has had tracks included in the sequel to Largo Winch (the film adaptation).

In 2016 their 4th album, Colours, was released.

In 2017 many of their songs were incorporated into the soundtrack of the film The Son of Bigfoot.

In popular culture 
Grupo Antena 3, a Spanish business concern used the Puggy song "We Had It Made" in promotional campaign when Grupo Antena 3 announced its name change to Atresmedia Group on March 6, 2013.

Discography

Albums

EPs
Teaser (2009)

Singles

References

Belgian pop music groups